Jimi Tunnell is an American guitarist and vocalist from Denton, Texas. Although he is known as a guitarist, his career began as a jazz trumpeter.

Tunnell has worked with Yukihiro Takahashi, Laurie Anderson, Steps Ahead, and Member's Only. His band Trilateral Commission includes percussionist  José Rossy of Weather Report. He is a member of the Rodney Holmes Trio, which includes bassist Alphonso Johnson, also from Weather Report. He is a featured artist on the Origin Records releases Time Within Itself and Origin Suite.

He sang the chorus on the two first hits by singer Shannon, Let the Music Play and Give Me Tonight, although he was uncredited.

References

Year of birth missing (living people)
Living people
People from Denton, Texas
American jazz guitarists
American male guitarists
Jazz musicians from Texas
American male jazz musicians
Steps Ahead members
Members Only (band) members